Khouloud ElGamal (born in [Cairo, Egypt) (also spelled Khouloud Al-Gamal and خلود الجمل) is an Egyptian journalist/TV producer based in London since 2001. She started as reporter for French speaking outlets like Al-Ahram Hebdo and Radio Cairo and also for Youm7  She received few awards on her reporting on citizen journalism, current affairs, Foreign Policy, sufism, bedouins, Islamic extremism and her Grand reportages and travel writings. She is consultant and guest speaker on citizen journalism, social medias and filmmaking.

She was married to Hosam El Sokkari, the former head of the BBC Arabic and Former head of Yahoo Inc in the Middle East.

References

Published articles  :

Hésitations à Londres - Al-Ahram Hebdo by Khouloud Al-Gamal 

Le dossier | Sud-Liban - Al-Ahram Hebdo by Khouloud Al-Gamal 

Que se passe-t-il à Kocheh ? by Khouloud Al-Gamal 

La vie d'avant le Haut-Barrage by Khouloud Elgamal 

Iraq, Une décennie perdue, Le handicap des médecins iraqiens by Khouloud Elgamal 

Coptes-Musulmans, Une sagesse ancestrale inébranlable by Khouloud Elgamal  

Libye, «le peuple féminin armé» by Khouloud Elgamal 

Bagdad, Le fiasco humanitaire by Khouloud Elgamal 

Khouloud Elgamal's Interview with Peter Hansen http://cedej.bibalex.org/DocumentFrm.aspx?documentID=698246&lang=en&All=Kholoud+Al+Gamal

Interview with Ahron Bregman 

Interview with Peter Hansen, UNRWA, UN, [https://en.wikipedia.org/wiki/Peter_Hansen_(UN) [http://cedej.bibalex.org/DocumentFrm.aspx?documentID=698246&lang=en&All=Kholoud+Al+Gamal[

The Metropolitan Police and the three water cannons plan, by Khouloud Elgamal 

FCO's Barry Marston in an Interview with Khouloud Elgamal 

Cited in The Real (Arab) World: Is Reality TV Democratizing the Middle East? 

Documentaries by Khouloud Elgamal

Blogging on the Nile - Egypt 

Arab Creative Women  

Jihad TV 

The Muslim Televangelists 

Cited in The Yom Kippur War: Politics, Legacy, Diplomacy  The Yom Kippur War: Politics, Legacy, Diplomacy

Khouloud Elgamal is Cited in The Spy Who Fell to Earth: My Relationship with the Secret Agent Who Rocked the Middle East
by Ahron Bregman 

Cited in Electoral Institutions in Non-Democratic Regimes:
The Impact of the 1990 Electoral Reform on Patterns of Party
Development in Mubarak’s Egypt http://etheses.lse.ac.uk/2916/1/U615867.pdf by Hendrik Jan Kratzschmar

Cited in The Long Wait: Reform in Egypt’s State- Owned Broadcasting Service, by Issandr El Amrani
https://www.arabmediasociety.com/the-long-wait-reform-in-egypts-state-owned-broadcasting-service/

Cited in The Real (Arab) World: Is Reality TV Democratizing the Middle East? 
https://www.google.co.uk/search?tbm=bks&hl=en&q=khouloud+al+gamal+ahram+hebdo

Cited in Chronique d'une guerre d'Orient  by Kepel, Gilles Gilles Kepel

Egyptian journalists
Living people
1971 births